The blackberry is a widespread and well known shrub of the genus Rubus, and its fruit.

Blackberry may also refer to:

Company and products
 BlackBerry Limited, formerly known as Research in Motion Ltd, with the following products:
 BlackBerry, smartphones by Blackberry Ltd.
 BlackBerry 10, the mobile operating system used by BlackBerry devices released between 2013 and 2015
 List of BlackBerry 10 devices, Devices shipped with the BlackBerry 10 operating system
 BlackBerry OS, the original operating system used by BlackBerry smartphone devices
 BlackBerry Bold, QWERTY keyboard smartphones by Research in Motion Ltd
 BlackBerry Torch, a full-touchscreen line of smartphones by Research in Motion Ltd
 BlackBerry Curve, an entry-level line of smartphones by Research in Motion Ltd
 BlackBerry Tour, a previous line of smartphones by Research in Motion Ltd
 BlackBerry PlayBook, a touchscreen tablet computer by Research in Motion Ltd
 BlackBerry Priv, an Android slider device developed by BlackBerry Limited

Characters
 Blackberry (Watership Down), a fictional rabbit

People
 Blackberri (1945–2021), American singer-songwriter and community activist
 George Odhiambo (born 1992), Kenyan association footballer known as Blackberry
 Wren Blackberry, children's fiction author

Places
 Black Berry Islands, Nunavut, Canada
 Blackberry Creek (Kentucky)
 Blackberry Creek (Missouri)
 Blackberry Township, Itasca County, Minnesota, USA
 Blackberry Township, Kane County, Illinois, USA

Songs
 "Blackberry" (song), by the Black Crowes
 "Blackberry Way", by The Move

Film
 BlackBerry (film), a 2023 film

See also
Blackberry Blossom (disambiguation)
Black raspberry